The Arcadia Women's Pro Open is a tournament for professional female tennis players played on outdoor hard courts. The event is classified as a $60,000 ITF Women's World Tennis Tour tournament and has been held in Arcadia, California since 2022.

Past finals

Singles

Doubles

External links 
 ITF search

2022 establishments in California
Recurring sporting events established in 2022
ITF Women's World Tennis Tour
Hard court tennis tournaments
Tennis tournaments in California
Tennis tournaments in the United States
Arcadia, California